The Stsviha or Stvyha is a river of Ukraine and Belarus. It is a tributary of the Pripyat River in the Dnieper basin. A notable marsh wetland known as the Polesia, home to about 265 different species of bird, lies between the Pripyat, Stsviha and Ubort Rivers.

References

Rivers of Belarus
Rivers of Rivne Oblast